The Patchwork Girl of Oz (1914) is a silent film made by L. Frank Baum's The Oz Film Manufacturing Company. It was based on the 1913 book The Patchwork Girl of Oz.

The film was written and produced by L. Frank Baum and directed by J. Farrell MacDonald. It makes almost no use of the dialog from the book in the intertitles. While there are a number of modest special effects, the movie relies largely on dancing (or rather cavorting), slapstick, and costuming. The Patchwork Girl uses acrobatics regularly. Dr. Pipt's daughter is added for love interest, as well as an additional plot thread: her boyfriend is turned into a small statue which women find irresistible. The plot omits the Glass Cat, the Shaggy Man, and the phonograph, but also adds Mewel, a donkey, and "The Lonesome Zoop", both slapstick animals.

Production
Much of the film was shot on the grounds of the Panama-California Exposition in San Diego. Other scenes were presumably filmed at The Oz Film Manufacturing Company's studio facilities in Los Angeles, located on Santa Monica Boulevard.

Notable cast members, one uncredited, were future producer/director Hal Roach and comedian Harold Lloyd. The two of them, after meeting on this film, worked together for several years.

Baum cast acrobat Pierre Couderc in the title role because, due to social restrictions, he was unable to find a woman with the level of acrobatic training to do the role.

Distribution and preservation
The movie was a commercial failure, a fact which caused distribution problems for the other Oz Film titles that followed it. This contributed to the failing of The Oz Film Manufacturing Company.

The movie is one of three made by the Oz Film company that have not been lost. Some versions contain uncredited narration by Jacqueline Lovell. The International Wizard of Oz Club has extensive information on the production, for example in The Baum Bugle, Christmas 1972.  The original film was screened at the 2013 Winkie Convention of the International Wizard of Oz Club with the original Gottschalk score played live by Joe Cascone on piano from Gottschalk's original manuscripts.

Cast

Credited cast
 Violet MacMillan - Ojo, a Munchkin Boy
 Frank Moore - Unc Nunkie, Ojo's Guardian
 Raymond Russell - Dr. Pipt, the Crooked Magician
 Leontine Dranet - Margolotte, his wife, who makes the Patchwork Girl
 Bobbie Gould - Jesseva, his daughter, betrothed to Danx
 Marie Wayne - Jinjur, a Maid in the Emerald City
 Dick Rosson - Danx, a Noble Munchkin
 Frank Bristol - The Soldier with the Green Whiskers (Omby Amby)
 Fred Woodward - The Woozy, a Quaintness / The Zoop, A Mystery / Mewel, who is Everybody's Friend
 Todd Wright - The Wizard of Oz
 Bert Glennon - The Scarecrow (as Herbert Glennon)
 Hal Roach - The Cowardly Lion / Tottenhot
 Andy Anderson - The Hungry Tiger
 Jessie May Walsh - Ozma of Oz, the Ruler of the Emerald City
 William Cook - The Royal Chamberlain
 Ben Deeley - Rozyn, the Village Fiddler
 Lon Musgrave - The Tin Woodman
 Pierre Couderc - Scraps, the Patchwork Girl (as The Marvelous Couderc)

Additional cast
 Vivian Reed - Ozma head logo (uncredited)
 Juanita Hansen - Bell Ringer (uncredited)
 Harold Lloyd - Tottenhot on the Jury (uncredited)
 Jacqueline Lovell - Narrator (1996 version) (voice)

External links

 
 
 

1914 films
American black-and-white films
American silent feature films
Films based on The Wizard of Oz
Films directed by J. Farrell MacDonald
Paramount Pictures films
Works by L. Frank Baum
Articles containing video clips
Surviving American silent films
1910s American films
Silent American fantasy films